Malus is the eighth extended play by South Korean boy band Oneus. It was released by RBW and distributed by Kakao Entertainment on September 5, 2022. The EP contains seven tracks, including the lead single, "Same Scent". Malus debuted atop the Circle Album Chart, with over 201,000 copies sold of its physical, Poca and Meta versions. This album marks their final release with Ravn as his departure from the group was announced on October 27, 2022.

Background and release 
On August 16, Oneus announced that they would make a comeback on September 5 with Malus.

Critical reception
NME described "Same Scent" as "new tropical house", penchant for incorporating traditional Korean instruments and culture into both their songs and videos.

On September 13, the group earned their first music show win with "Same Scent" on SBS M's The Show. On September 14, the group earned their second music show win with "Same Scent" on MBC M's Show Champion.

Year-end lists

Track listing

Charts

Weekly charts

Monthly charts

Year-end charts

Release history

References 

2022 EPs
Korean-language EPs
Oneus albums